Seghir Beddari (born 18 July 1901, date of death unknown) was a French long-distance runner. He competed in the men's 5000 metres at the 1928 Summer Olympics.

References

1901 births
Year of death missing
Athletes (track and field) at the 1928 Summer Olympics
French male long-distance runners
Olympic athletes of France
Sportspeople from Constantine, Algeria